Queen is a 2018 Indian Malayalam-language thriller film directed by Dijo Jose Antony, written by Sharis Mohammed and Jebin Joseph Antony and produced by Arabian Dreams Entertainment Co by Shibu K Moideen & Rinshad Vellodathil. It features Saniya Iyappan as Chinnu, the sole female entry in a Mechanical Engineering batch in a college. The film was released in India on 12 January 2018. The idea for creating such a movie was inspired from the 2015 Onam Celebration that took place in College of Engineering Adoor, Pathanamthitta, which was a massive controversy, and Sree Buddha College of Engineering, Pattoor, Alappuzha an institution in Kerala where a mass gang of boys and their only female classmate of the Mechanical Engineering Department made a dramatic entry making it a unique event becoming viral on internet too.
Saniya Iyappan won Filmfare Award for Best Female Debut – South for her performance in the film.   
It was remade in Tamil as  Friendship in 2021 starring Arjun, famous cricketer Harbhajan Singh , Losliya Mariyanesan and Sathish.

Plot
The story starts with the inauguration of a Mechanical Department in an engineering college. The beginning of the first year is filled with ragging and clever escapades by the boys from their seniors. Late in the first semester a girl, Chinnu (Saniya Iyappan) joins mechanical branch. She soon becomes a lovable character within the entire first year batch of the college. Her classmates discover that she is an orphan and a cancer patient. During her time at the hospital her friends keep her company and makes friends with other patients. She recovers from the cancer through chemotherapy and surgery, and visits college during Onam celebrations just to have fun with her friends and enjoy the campus life. She returns home in the evening to recuperate completely. Unexpectedly, she gets kidnapped by some anti socials and sexually assaulted. Even though Chinnu is hospitalised, she passes away. Her friends, along with the support of various people from the community fight for justice and also against the malign grips of social institutions that is meant to protect the underprivileged. In the process, they are helped by Adv. Mukundan (Salim Kumar), a lawyer fighting for justice. In the end, the real culprits are caught and delivered a death sentence by the Trial Court. The students in the end, turn to social service. The film ends with this message "women are not opportunities but responsibilities of men"

Cast

 Saniya Iyappan as Chinnu
 Dhruvan as Balu
 Aswin Jose as Muneer / Kooli
 Eldho Mathew as Eldho
 Arun Haridas as Jaban
 Sooraj Kumar as Varghese Kurien / Varkichan
 Sam Sibin as Shankar / Gymman
 Muhasin Moozi as Shyam / Shyama
 Jenson Alappat as Madapravu Ajith
 Vijayaraghavan as Principal Alex Abhraham
 Salim Kumar as Adv. Mukundan (Extended Cameo) (Character from Meeshamadhavan)
 Nandhu as Adv. Kaaloor
 Kalasala Babu as Judge
 Sreejith Ravi as Minister
 Junice I V as Comrade Naushadikka
 Midhun A. E. as Senior student
 Monika Thomas Puthuran as Eliza
 Sunil K Babu as Viswaroopan (Buji)
 Kalabhavan Niyas Aboobacker as Head of Mechanical Department
 Dijo Jose Antony as Professor at Mechanical Department, Signing Professor at Marriage (Guest Appearance)
 Aneesh G Menon as Minister's assistant
 Sethu Lakshmi as Mother Thresiamma
 Santhosh Keezhattoor as Bride's father
 Malini Sivaraman as Bride's friend
 Baby Meenakshi as Bride's sister
 Jaimi Afzal as Bride
 Leona Lishoy
 Deepika Mohan as Balu's mother
 Hochimin K C

Production
Movie was produced by Shibu K Moideen and Rinshad Vellodathil, from the studio Arabian Dreams Entertainment.

Music

The original songs for the film were composed by Jakes Bejoy, with lyrics written by Joe Paul, Sharis Muhammed, and Jyothish T. Kasi. The soundtrack album was released by Satyam Audios on 3 January 2018. Dijo Jose Antony and Arun Nandakumar choreographed the songs "Saare Njangal" and "Podi Parane" respectively.

Release
The film was released on 12 January 2018 across 84 theaters in Kerala.

Reception

Critical response
Arjun R Krishnan from Malayala Manorama has written that 'Queen', the debut work by director Dijo Jose Antony, presents quite a few contemporary issues in a titillating cinematic wrap and rated the movie 3.5 out of 5.

The film, however, was not received well by some feminist critics. Anna MM Vetticad of Firstpost refused to rate the film, calling it a 'non-film', and was outraged by the fact that this 'nondescript' film managed to get released not only in Kerala, but outside it as well, when far superior films were struggling to find theaters. Sowmya Rajendran of The News Minute wrote that the film does a disservice to rape survivors by suggesting that the rape and murder of the female protagonist in the film is tragic only because she was an orphan, a cancer patient, and blameless in all respects. She also criticized the film's concluding message that men should see women as their responsibility and assume the role of their protectors.

References

External links
 

Indian coming-of-age films
Films set in universities and colleges
2010s Malayalam-language films
Films about rape in India
Indian thriller drama films
2010s coming-of-age films
2018 thriller drama films
Films scored by Jakes Bejoy